is a 2003 Japanese anime film directed by Kihachirō Kawamoto. It is based on one of the renku (collaborative linked poems) in the 1684 collection of the same name by the 17th-century Japanese poet Bashō.

The creation of the film followed the traditional collaborative nature of the source material – the visuals for each of the 36 stanzas were independently created by 35 different animators. As well as many Japanese animators, Kawamoto assembled leading names of animation from across the world. Each animator was asked to contribute at least 30 seconds to illustrate their stanza, and most of the sequences are under a minute (Yuri Norstein's, though, is nearly two minutes long).

The released film consists of the 40-minute animation, followed by an hour-long 'Making of' documentary, including interviews with the animators. Winter Days won the Grand Prize of the Japan Media Arts Festival in 2003.

Bashō's hokku, or opening verse, of the 36-verse poem:

Animated segments
Norstein animated the opening stanza (hokku) as the special guest (kyaku). Chikusai is running around listening to trees, and meets Bashō. He's awed, but is amused to see that Bashō is picking bugs out of a cloak that is as torn as his own. He gives Bashō his own hat in exchange for Bashō's (which has a gaping hole at the top) and goes away. Suddenly, the wind picks up and blows the torn hat away. Chikusai chases after it and manages to catch it, but then with a shrug lets it go and allows it to fly off wherever the wind will take it. Meanwhile, Bashō is moving slowly and laboriously against the wind, with a hand on his new hat to keep it from flying away.

Speaking at the November 30, 2007 Russian theatrical premiere of Winter Days, Norstein said that he had made a longer, 3-minute version of this segment, but had not yet added sound to it.

Kawamoto animated the second (waki) and final (ageku) stanzas as the organiser (shōshō).

DVD releases
The film is currently available in four DVD versions, none of which has English dubbing or subtitles.
 Regular Japanese release, November 22, 2003 (R2, NTSC).  Contains original film (40+65 min), no subtitles.
 "Complete Box" Japanese release, November 22, 2003 (R2, NTSC).  Contains film + eight additional DVDs with making-of featurettes (total: 945 mins).  No subtitles.
 Korean "RABA Animation" release, February 7, 2006 (R3, NTSC). Contains Korean subtitles; otherwise, identical to "regular" Japanese release in all but the region encoding and price.
 French release, June 20, 2008 (R2, PAL). Original animation with French audio, and 'making-of' with French sub-titles.

See also

 List of films based on poems
 List of animated feature films
 List of stop-motion films
 Renku
 Matsuo Bashō

References

External links
 
 In-depth interview with Yuri Norstein about his segment  (English translation)
 Original poem text (Japanese)

2003 anime films
Collaborative poetry
Films based on poems
Films directed by Yuri Norstein
Films directed by Aleksandr Petrov
Films directed by Břetislav Pojar
Films directed by Raoul Servais
Films directed by Isao Takahata
Films directed by Kōji Yamamura
Japanese animated films
Japanese poetry
Animated anthology films
Films using stop-motion animation
Articles containing Japanese poems